Gēr may refer to:

Old High German for "spear", see Migration Period spear
Old Anglo-Frisian for year, see Jēram